The Politics of Shaoyang in Hunan province in the People's Republic of China is structured in a dual party-government system like all other governing institutions in mainland China.

The Mayor of Shaoyang is the highest-ranking official in the People's Government of Shaoyang or Shaoyang Municipal Government. However, in the city's dual party-government governing system, the Mayor has less power than the Communist Party of Shaoyang Municipal Committee Secretary, colloquially termed the "CPC Party Chief of Shaoyang" or "Communist Party Secretary of Shaoyang".

History
On December 18, 2013, Tong Mingqian was placed under investigation by the Central Commission for Discipline Inspection of the Communist Party of China for "serious violations of laws and regulations". 

On July 24, 2015, the Central Commission for Discipline Inspection (CCDI), the Communist Party's top anti-corruption body, placed Zhou Benshun under investigation.

List of mayors of Shaoyang

List of CPC Party secretaries of Shaoyang

References

Shaoyang
Shaoyang